The Giroux Consolidated Company experienced two mining accidents at a copper mine in Ely, Nevada, one on December, 4 1907 and another on August 24, 1911. 

In the 1907 collapse 2 men were killed and 4 other men were trapped 1000 feet down in a mining shaft for 46 days. In the 1911 fire at the Giroux mine 7 men were killed and two others were badly injured.

1907 Giroux mine collapse
The mine was owned by the Giroux Consolidated Company. Four men became trapped 1000 feet down in the Alpha Shaft of the Giroux mine when the earth caved in. They tapped on a pipe to let others know that they were trapped in the collapse. Food and water were sent down each day. The food, water and air the trapped men needed all came through a 6-inch pipe.

The mine owners hired diggers to work in four hour shifts. The diggers were paid $5 each and the mine owners said the total cast was $200 per day.  

The men were finally rescued January 20, 1908 after 47 days underground.

1911 Giroux mine fire
On August 24, 1911, there was a fire at the Giroux mine. The miners were 1400 feet down in the shaft of the Giroux mine when an explosion of a barrel of oil caused a fire above the men in the elevator shaft. The men decided to ride the cage elevator through the flames. The men were all burned very badly. 7 men were killed and 3 were injured

When the elevator reached the top men rushed to the cage to attend to the wounded. The smoke prevented the rescue. The cage was raised 25 feet above the shaft and several of the miners were saved.

The mine was repaired by February 1912, and mining activities resumed.

See also
Mining accidents
Mining in the United States

References

External links

CDC - Major Disasters at Metal and Nonmetal Mines and Quarries in the US (not coal mines)
Giroux Mine Fire

Coal mines in the United States
1907 in the United States
1911 in the United States
1907 mining disasters
1911 mining disasters
Coal mining disasters in the United States
1900s in Utah